The Crushin' It World Tour was the tenth headlining concert tour by American country music singer Brad Paisley and is in support of his tenth studio album Moonshine in the Trunk (2014). It began on May 15, 2015, in Camden, New Jersey and finished on March 12, 2016, in Bloomington, Illinois. The tour played through amphitheaters and festivals across the United States and Canada.

Background
The tour was first announced in February 2015, through Paisley's website. Opening up for Paisley for most of the dates will be Justin Moore and Mickey Guyton. Inspiration for the tour's name comes from Paisley's current single, "Crushin' It". Dates for the second leg were announced on October 20, 2015.

Concert synopsis
The show began with a thirty-second countdown clock to "happy hour", then Paisley emerges on stage. During "Time Warp", Paisley invited a young a fan to come on stage and play Mario Kart, which was shown on the video screen. For the first leg of the show Paisley sang "I'm Still a Guy" with Justin Moore and "Whiskey Lullaby" with Micky Guyton, then closed the show with both first-leg opening acts during "Alcohol".

Stage production 
The stage was two levels; back behind was sixty-foot video screen, and in the middle of the audience was B-stage. Also on stage is a functioning bar where VIP fans and contest winners can sit during the show.

Opening acts

Justin Moore
Mickey Guyton
Dustin Lynch
Cassadee Pope
Ashley Monroe
RaeLynn
Eric Paslay 
Cam

Setlist

{{hidden
| headercss = background: #ccccff; font-size: 100%; width: 59%;
| contentcss = text-align: left; font-size: 100%; width: 75%;
| header = Brad Paisley Setlist I
| content = This is a representation of the Camden, New Jersey show.
"River Bank"
"Water"
"Moonshine In The Trunk"
"Celebrity"
"I'm Still a Guy" 
"This Is Country Music"
"Beat This Summer"
"Perfect Storm"
"American Saturday Night"
"Whiskey Lullaby" 
"Time Warp" 
"Ticks"
"Old Alabama" 
B-Stage
"She's Everything"
Main stage
"Southern Comfort Zone"
"Mud on the Tires"
"I'm Gonna Miss Her (The Fishin' Song)"
"Crushin' It"
Encore
"Then"
"Alcohol" 

Source:
}}
{{hidden
| headercss = background: #ccccff; font-size: 100%; width: 59%;
| contentcss = text-align: left; font-size: 100%; width: 75%;
| header = Brad Paisley Setlist II
| content =  This is a representation on the Syracuse, New York show.
"River Bank"
"Water"
"Moonshine in the Trunk
"Celebrity"
"Country Nation"
"This Is Country Music"
"I'm Still a Guy"
"She's Everything"
"Ticks"
"American Saturday Night"
"Whiskey Lullaby"
"Beat This Summer"
"Perfect Storm"
"Old Alabama"
"Waitin' on a Woman"
"Remind Me"
"Southern Comfort Zone"
"I'm Gonna Miss Her (The Fishin' Song)"
"Crushin' It"
"Mud on the Tires"
Encore
"Online"
"Then"
"Alcohol"
Source:

}}

Tour dates

Miscellaneous performances
 This concert is a part of the Faster Horses Festival.
 This concert is a part of the Mountain Home Country Music Festival.
 This concert is a part of the Boots and Hearts Music Festival.
 This concert is a part of the Texas Thunder Country Music Festival.
 This concert is a part of KYGO's Birthday Bash.

Critical reception
''Syracuse.com'''s Dan Poorman says, "You don't have to be a country music fan to enjoy a Brad Paisley show."

References

2015 concert tours
2016 concert tours
Brad Paisley concert tours